USS LST-989 was an  in the United States Navy. Like many of her class, she was not named and is properly referred to by her hull designation.

LST-989 was laid down on 10 February 1944 at the Boston Navy Yard; launched on 12 March 1944; sponsored by Mrs. Arthur L. Anderson; and commissioned on 28 April 1944.

Service history
During World War II, LST-989 was assigned to the European theater and participated in the invasion of southern France in August and September 1944. Following the war, LST-989 performed occupation duty in the Far East and saw service in China until mid-April 1946. She was decommissioned on 7 October 1946 and struck from the Navy list on 13 November that same year. On 25 June 1948, the ship was sold to the Humble Oil & Refining Co., of Houston, Texas, for operation.

LST-989 earned one battle star for World War II service.

References

LST-542-class tank landing ships
World War II amphibious warfare vessels of the United States
Ships built in Boston
1944 ships